Singhalia sarcoglauca is a moth of the family Pyralidaefirst described by George Hampson in 1896. It is found in Sri Lanka.

References

Moths of Asia
Moths described in 1896
Phycitini